Kubus may refer to:

People
 Lukáš Kubus (born 1988), Slovak football forward
 Richard Kubus (1914–1987), German international footballer

Other uses
 Kubuś, a Polish improvised fighting vehicle
 Kubus (company), a Polish food and drink company
 Kubus scheme, a scheme that originated in South Africa in the 1980s
 Kubus Mountain, a mountain in Queen Maud Land, Antarctica